Galina Kamaeva (born 1939) is a Soviet swimmer who won a silver medal in the 4×100 m medley relay at the 1958 European Aquatics Championships, where she swam the butterfly leg.

Between 1956 and 1959 she won several national titles in butterfly, backstroke and medley events. In the 2000s, she competed in the masters category and won 15 national titles, setting four national records.

She was born in Volgograd but then moved to Chernyakhovsk. After marriage, she changed her last name to Egorova.

References

1939 births
Living people
Russian female swimmers
Russian female butterfly swimmers
Soviet female swimmers
European Aquatics Championships medalists in swimming
Sportspeople from Volgograd